The Islamic International Peacekeeping Brigade (abbreviated IIPB), also known as the Islamic International Brigade, the Islamic Peacekeeping Army, was the name of an international Islamist mujahideen organization, founded in 1998. IIPB was designated a terrorist entity by the United States in February 2003.

History
The unit was composed of between 400 and 1,500 militants, most of them Dagestanis (mainly Avars and Darginians), as well as Chechens, Arabs, Turksand other foreign fighters.

Its Emirs (leaders) were the Arab Mujahid Ibn Al-Khattab and Chechen Shamil Basayev, and was active in the War in Dagestan where many of its members were killed or captured by Russian forces. Most of its remaining members fought in the Second Chechen War, in which its former leaders died (Khattab in March 2002 and Basayev in July 2006)

References

Jihadist groups
Organizations established in 1998
Defunct organizations designated as terrorist
Organizations designated as terrorist by Bahrain
Organizations designated as terrorist by Iraq
Islamic terrorism in Russia
Moscow theater hostage crisis
Second Chechen War
Defunct Islamic organizations
Pan-Islamism
Organizations disestablished in 2002
Islamic organizations established in 1998